Mokhtarnameh (Persian: مختارنامه lit. The Book of Mokhtar)) is an Iranian epic/history television series directed by Davood Mirbagheri, based on the life of Al-Mukhtar,  a pro-Alid revolutionary based in Kufa, who led a rebellion against the Umayyad Caliphate in 685 and ruled over most of Iraq for eighteen months during the Second Fitna. Over 140 actors were cast in it. It was originally shot in Persian language but was lately dubbed into Arabic, English, Urdu and Bengali languages respectively.

Plot summary
After nine years of farming and away from the battlefield, Mukhtar returns to politics when Hasan ibn Ali is injured in his battle with Muawiyah's forces. Years later, Mukhtar arrives in Kufa to prepare for Ḥusayn ibn ‘Alī''s arrival. On Yazid's orders, Ibn Ziyad arrives and unites the people of Kufa against Husayn by using lies. Mukhtar is imprisoned to prevent the riot. He is released after the battle of Karbala on Yazid's orders. Mukhtar vows to avenge Husayn's death. Needing allies, he travels to Mecca and meets Ibn Zubayr. Mukhtar helps Ibn Zubayr's brother, Mus'ab, defeat an Umayyad assault; but no alliance is made. Mukhtar returns to Kufa and unites the people now that Ibn Ziyad has returned to Damascus and Kufa is leaderless. Mukhtar expels Ibn Zubayr's appointed governor and takes control of the city. During the next years he kills almost all of Husayn's murderers, including Ibn Ziyad, Umar and Shimr, while battling both Umayyad caliph and Ibn Zubayr's armies. Eventually he is defeated by Mus'ab's army and retreats to his palace in Kufa. After one year, Mukhtar orders his forces to march and break the siege; but only few follow him outside. Mukhtar is killed and Mus'ab surprisingly orders all of Mukhtar's soldiers who have surrendered to be decapitated.

Cast
 Fariborz Arabnia as Al-Mukhtar
 Zhaleh Olov as the mother of Al-Mukhtar
 Davoud Rashidi as the father-in-law of Al-Mukhtar
 Farhad Aslani as Ubayd Allah ibn Ziyad
 Amin Zendegani as Muslim ibn Aqeel
 Reza Kianian as Abd Allah Ibn Zubayr
 Mohammad-Reza Sharifinia as Muhammad ibn al-Hanafiyyah
 Seyed Javad Hashemi as the commander-in-chief of Hassan's army
 Parvin Soleimani as a woman selling pickles
 Vishka Asayesh as Ja'ada bint al-Ash Ath (Hassan ibn Ali's wife)
 Gohar Kheirandish as Hannaneh
 Hadis Fooladvand as Rahele (wife of Ibrahim ibn Malik al-Ashtar)
 Elham Hamidi as Shirin (wife of Kian)
 Kazem HajirAzad as Muhalab
 Behnaz Jafari as Marieh (wife of Ubaidullah ibn Hurr Jofi)
 Karim Akbari Mobarakeh as Ahmar ibn Shomait
 Fariba Kowsari as Umra (wife of Mukhtar)
 Mehdi Fakhimzadeh as Umar ibn Sa'd
 Nasrin Moghanloo as Narieh (wife of Mukhtar)
 Ebrahim Abadi as Ubaydah (Mokhtar's assistant)
 Mohammad Sadeghi as Abdullah Bin Muteeh
 Bahram Shahmohammadloo as Abdullah Bin Yazid
 Shahram Haghighat Doost as Ubaidullah ibn Hurr Jofi
 Reza Rooygari as Kian (Mokhtar's Iranian assistant)
 Jafar Dehghan as Mus'ab ibn al-Zubayr
 Mohammad Fili as Shemr
 Hasan Pourshirazi as Bahram Rangraz
 Farrokh Nemati as Hani ibn Urwa
 Hamid Ataei as Saeb (Mokhtar's assistant)
 Hassan Mirbagheri as Ibrahim ibn Malik al-Ashtar
 Ahu Kheradmand as Khouli's Kufi Woman
 Mahmoud Jafari as Ma'aqhal
 Amir Reza Delavari as Masoud Saghafi
 Parviz Poorhosseini as Maytham al-Tammar
 Anoushirvan Arjmand as Rifaah ibn Shaddad
 Siamak Atlasi as Hussain ibn Numayr
 Valiollah Momeni as Shorahbill
 Hamed Haddadi as Yahya ibn Zamzam
 Behnoosh Tabatabaei as Khaashe'e (Wife of Monzar)
 Majid Alieslam as Monzar ibn Zobayr
 Saleh Mirza Aghaei as Jafar ibn Zubayr
 Fereydoun Sorani as Ebne Amin
 Shohreh Lorestani as Hamdanid Woman
 Abbas Amiri Moghaddam as Amer ibn Mas'oud
 Behnam Tashakkor as Ghole Zabiri
 Mostafa Tari as Ibn Huraith
 Enayat Shafiee as Abdollah ibn Kamel (Mokhtar's assistant)
 Ahmad Irandoost as Haroon Na’lband
 Mozafar Moghaddam as Shabas
 Reza Khandan as Sinan ibn Anas
 Bijan Afshar as Bin Ashas
 Mir Saleh Hosseini as Bin Hajjaj
 Mohammad Hossein Latifi as Bin Shahab
 Akbar Sultan Ali as Rustam (Shimr servant)
 Sirous Kahvari Nejad as Hurmala Servant

Production
The series, which took five years to complete, includes 40 episodes and is produced by Sima Film. The story reviews the events leading to the martyrdom of the Imams and ends with the adolescence of Mukhtar. 
The film also deals with sixteen years of Mukhtar’s life and includes the death of Muawiyah, the succession of Yazid, and the events leading to Ashura and whatever related to the uprising of Mukhtar until his and his companions’ martyrdom.

Music
The soundtrack for Mokhtarnameh was made by Amir Tavassoli with a choir. It was sung by Akbar Soltanali and recorded, mixed, and mastered by Ramin Mazaheri in Baran Studio.

Track listing

Adaptations and Broadcast

See also

 List of Islamic films
Loneliest Leader
 List of casualties in Husayn's army at the Battle of Karbala
 Salman the Persian (TV series)

References

External links

 Mokhtarnameh website
 
 Watch the Mokhtarnameh series online with English subtitles

Television series about Islam
Iranian television series
Cultural depictions of Husayn ibn Ali
2010s Iranian television series
2012 Iranian television series debuts
Islamic Republic of Iran Broadcasting original programming